Derksen is a Dutch surname which means son of Derk/Dirk, and may refer to:

 Dirk Jan Derksen (born 1972), Dutch footballer
 Geert-Jan Derksen, Dutch rower
 Jan Derksen (1919–2011), Dutch cyclist
 Jan Derksen (born 1951), Dutch speed skater (International championships participant in the 1970s, dutch profile)
 Johan Derksen (born 1949), Dutch footballer and sports journalist (editor-in-chief of Voetbal International)
 Piet Derksen (1913–1996), Dutch businessman and founder of Center Parcs
 Rick Derksen, (born 1964) Dutch linguist
 Rob Derksen (1960–2004), American professional baseball pitcher
 Robert-Jan Derksen (born 1974), Dutch golfer

Dutch-language surnames
Patronymic surnames
Surnames from given names